Abebe Wakgira (also spelled Abebe Wakjira born 21 October 1921) is an Ethiopian long-distance runner. Abebe competed in the marathon at the 1960 Summer Olympics in Rome, finishing seventh in 2:21.09.4. Both he and Abebe Bikila notably run and completed this Olympic marathon barefoot, after having found their team provided shoes uncomfortable.

References

External links
 

1921 births
Possibly living people
Athletes (track and field) at the 1960 Summer Olympics
Ethiopian male long-distance runners
Ethiopian male marathon runners
Olympic athletes of Ethiopia
20th-century Ethiopian people